Lenka Ilavská (born May 5, 1972 in Liptovský Mikuláš, Žilina Region) is a retired female racing cyclist from Slovakia. She represented her native country at the 1996 Summer Olympics in Atlanta, Georgia. Her biggest achievement was winning the 1993 Giro d'Italia Femminile.

Major results

1992
1st  Overall Emakumeen Bira
2nd Overall Internationale Thüringen Rundfahrt Der Frauen
2nd Overall Tour de Feminin-O cenu Českého Švýcarska
1993
1st  Overall Giro d'Italia Femminile
1st  Overall Internationale Thüringen Rundfahrt Der Frauen
1st  Time trial, National Road Championships
1st Stage 3 Emakumeen Bira
1994
1st  Time trial, National Road Championships
1st Stage 7 Giro d'Italia Femminile
1st Stage 1 Volta a Portugal WE
1995
1st  Overall Tour de Feminin-O cenu Českého Švýcarska
1st  Time trial, National Road Championships
1996
1st  Time trial, National Road Championships
1st Stage 3 
7th Overall Giro d'Italia Femminile
1997
1st  Time trial, National Road Championships
3rd Overall Tour de Feminin-O cenu Českého Švýcarska
10th Overall Tour Cycliste Féminin
1998
1st  Time trial, National Road Championships
1st Stage 2a Emakumeen Bira
2000
1st  Time trial, National Road Championships
2001
1st  Time trial, National Road Championships

References

External links

1972 births
Living people
Slovak female cyclists
Cyclists at the 1996 Summer Olympics
Olympic cyclists of Slovakia
Sportspeople from Liptovský Mikuláš